Joseph Paul Mulvey (born September 27, 1958) is a Canadian retired ice hockey player. He played in the National Hockey League with the Washington Capitals, Pittsburgh Penguins, and Los Angeles Kings between 1978 and 1982. Mulvey was born in Sudbury, Ontario and raised in Merritt, British Columbia.

Playing career
A hard-nosed left-winger, Mulvey played junior hockey with the Edmonton Oil Kings and the Portland Winter Hawks. He was selected in the 1978 NHL Draft by the Washington Capitals and played for parts of three seasons with the Capitals. Prior to the 1981–82 NHL season, he was sent to the Pittsburgh Penguins as compensation for the Capitals signing of Orest Kindrachuk. He would later be claimed on waivers by the Los Angeles Kings during the middle of the season.

It was during his brief tenure with the Kings that he would be involved in one of the most controversial incidents in the NHL. On January 24, 1982 in a game against the Vancouver Canucks, a fight broke out, and Kings' Head Coach Don Perry ordered Mulvey out onto the ice to fight. Mulvey, who had just returned from a recent suspension, refused, which angered Coach Perry who then accused him of not standing up for his teammates. Mulvey was benched for the rest of the game, and was placed on waivers a week later.  Coach Perry would later be fined and suspended for the incident, Mulvey would never play another game in the NHL. As he was seen as someone who would not stand up for his teammates when the time came.

Coaching career
For many years he was the head coach of the Reston Raiders of the Capital Beltway Hockey League. He then served as the head coach of the Virginia Statesmen of the Eastern Elite Amateur Hockey League and also coached Tier II hockey for the Prince William Panthers Hockey Club in Woodbridge, Virginia.

Personal life
After his playing career, Mulvey returned to the Washington, D.C.-area and settled in Reston, Virginia, where he bought a tennis club and turned it into a hockey facility with two rinks. His rink was instrumental in the growth of hockey in the Northern Virginia region and continues today under different ownership as SkateQuest of Reston.

His older brother, Grant Mulvey, had a long career with the NHL's Chicago Black Hawks.

Career statistics

Regular season and playoffs

External links
 
 Profile at hockeydraftcentral.com

1958 births
Living people
Canadian ice hockey left wingers
Edmonton Oil Kings (WCHL) players
Ice hockey people from British Columbia
Ice hockey people from Ontario
Los Angeles Kings players
Merritt Centennials players
People from the Thompson-Nicola Regional District
Pittsburgh Penguins players
Portland Winterhawks players
Sportspeople from Greater Sudbury
Washington Capitals draft picks
Washington Capitals players